Ubiquitin carboxyl-terminal hydrolase 1 is an enzyme that in humans is encoded by the USP1 gene.

This gene encodes a member of the ubiquitin-specific processing (UBP) family of proteases that is a deubiquitinating enzyme (DUB) with His and Cys domains. This protein is located in the cytoplasm and cleaves the ubiquitin moiety from ubiquitin-fused precursors and ubiquitinylated proteins. 

The protein specifically deubiquitinates a protein in the Fanconi anemia (FA) DNA repair pathway. Alternate transcriptional splice variants have been characterized.

References

Further reading